Jeff Tarpinian (born October 16, 1987) is an Armenian-American football linebacker who is currently a free agent. He was signed by the New England Patriots as an undrafted free agent in 2011. He played college football at Iowa.

Early years
He was named 2005 Nebraska Gatorade Player of the Year. He was selected to the first-team all-state and all-conference in his senior season. He was an honorable mention all-state in both his sophomore and junior season along with the second-team all-conference as a junior season.

College career
He was named to the Academic all-Big Ten  in both his Freshman and Sophomore seasons.

Professional career

New England Patriots
Tarpinian went undrafted in the 2011 NFL Draft and signed with the New England Patriots as a rookie free agent in July, soon after the end of the 2011 NFL lockout.

After being elevated to the active roster on September 22, he made the first defensive start of his NFL career on Sunday Night Football in Week 10 against the division rival New York Jets. He recorded 3 solo tackles and an assist in the team's 37-16 victory.

On November 24, 2011, the Patriots placed Tarpinian on injured reserve, with the listed reason as a "head injury". It would be revealed years later that injury was in fact a cerebral cavernous malformation that required brain surgery. Tarpinian was able to make a full recovery and return to the Patriots for the 2012 season, playing mainly on special teams.

Houston Texans
After spending time on the Carolina Panther's practice squad, the Houston Texans signed Tarpinian to their active roster in October 2013. He would go on to play in 8 games that season, making 3 starts.

Tarpinian would return to the Texans in 2014, reuniting him with former Patriots Offensive Coordinator Bill O'Brien, who was hired that offseason as head coach. His role on the team that season was mainly on special teams.

Tarpinian was released by the Texans in September 2015 before their final preseason game and became an unrestricted free agent.

References

External links
Iowa Hawkeyes bio
New England Patriots bio
Houston Texans bio

1987 births
Living people
Sportspeople from Omaha, Nebraska
Players of American football from Nebraska
American football linebackers
Iowa Hawkeyes football players
New England Patriots players
Carolina Panthers players
Houston Texans players